R. Thomas (March 13, 1961 – 1971) was an American Thoroughbred racehorse bred in Kentucky by Bull Hancock at his renowned Claiborne Farm. Sired by Nadir, the 1957 American Co-Champion Two-Year-Old Colt, his dam was Fleet Flight, a daughter of 1948 U.S. Triple Crown champion, Count Fleet.

Raced by Roger W. Wilson, and trained by former jockey David Erb, R. Thomas was a top handicap horse in American middle distance racing during the mid 1960s. Among his wins, the bay gelding captured two editions of the Westchester Handicap at Aqueduct Racetrack in Queens, New York.

References

1961 racehorse births
1971 racehorse deaths
Thoroughbred family 16-g
Racehorses bred in Kentucky
Racehorses trained in the United States